Un-Dam the Klamath (#UnDamtheKlamath) is a social movement in the United States to remove the dams on the Klamath River primarily because they obstruct salmon, steelhead, and other species from accessing the upper basin which provides hundreds of miles of spawning habitat. The dams have also significantly harmed Hupa, Karuk, Klamath, and Yurok lifeways and communities. Copco #1, Copco #2, Iron Gate (all in California) and J.C. Boyle (in Oregon) are the four hydroelectric dams on the Klamath River that are being advocated for removal.

The movement to remove the dams has been ongoing for at least 20 years and gained national attention following the 2002 Klamath River fish kill, when at least 33,000 salmon and steelhead died along the banks of the Klamath upon returning to the river and failing to reach their spawning grounds in the upper basin. The movement argues that the dams should be removed because they create toxic algal blooms, dwindle salmon numbers and create illness in the fish, threaten tribal subsistence and increase health risks for tribal members, and harm the West Coast fishing industry. Seven species of fish are threatened by the dams.  The dam removal has also been cited as economically beneficial.

Opposition groups have included local landowners around the reservoirs created by the dams and corporate parties like PacifiCorp owned by Warren Buffett. PacifiCorp initially agreed to dam removal in 2009, yet after a decade of negotiations pulled out of the agreement when the Federal Energy Regulatory Commission (FERC) stated that they should take responsibility and pay for the removal, rather than simply walk away, as had been agreed upon by all parties. Support groups cite environmental racism and classism as a reason as to why the dams have yet to be removed. Removal of the dams would be the largest dam removal project in the world and would restore access for fish to their historical cold-water habitat.

Background 

The Hupa, Karuk, Klamath, and Yurok have fished along the Klamath for thousands of years. Settlers invaded the region during the California Gold Rush and engaged in uncontrolled and destructive logging and mining which destroyed salmon spawning habitats and resulted in genocide. In 1855, it was reported that three out of every Yurok had been killed through settler violence or disease. Those who managed to survive were corralled into a small reservation, displaced and disconnected from most of their lands. By the 1870s, the population of all Indigenous peoples on the Klamath had declined by 75 percent. In the late 19th century, the forced removal of children to Indian boarding schools led to further cultural genocide and the destruction of Indigenous worldviews.

In 1906, the first canal of the Klamath Irrigation Project was completed. Construction of Copco #1 and #2 began in 1918 and were completed shortly after. By the 1930s, the irrigation project had resulted in near total extinction of salmon. As a result, commercial fishing and Yurok tribal members were banned from fishing. The completion of the J.C. Boyle (1958) and the Iron Gate Dam (1964) damaged Indigenous lifeways and culture even more. Ron Reed, a member of the mid-Klamath Karuk Tribe, recalled that the river was the source of fish and other foods for his family into the 1960s, when the final dam, Iron Gate, was completed.

In 1978, the Supreme Court of California upheld the ban on fishing for tribes. The Yurok had been fighting to regain their rights to fish since the 1930s. This decision sparked protests from the tribe and repression from federal agents and police between 1978 and 1979. At times, violence was used against tribal members. In one instance, Yurok were hosting a birthday near the river "when agents arrived and pulled out their billy clubs." In 1979, the Supreme Court upheld a 1974 decision "that the tribes were entitled to 50 percent of harvestable salmon and that they should become co-managers of state fisheries," which brought an end to the conflict. In the 1980s, because of excessive logging practices by settlers, game, acorns and many other foods were depleted or destroyed.

The dams increasingly led to a decline in Indigenous fisheries, meaning that "Native families increasingly filled their bellies with store-bought and government commodity foods—cheap starches, fats and sugar. Chronic unemployment, despair and addictions rose in the gap left by the vanishing life in the river," as stated by Diana Hartel, who documents how settler presence and the dams have been destructive to Indigenous health through the "collapse of First Nations fisheries [which] had brought deepening poverty and with it soaring rates of diabetes." Hartel argues that because of the ways in which settlers are "disconnected from life rhythms millions of years old... we can wreak havoc on everything around us."

History

Relicensing 
The 2002 Klamath River fish kill, in which at least 33,000 fish were killed (some estimates say that it was over 70,000 fish), was important in generating support for dam removal and stopping corporate efforts to relicense the dams. As stated by Craig Tucker, consultant for the Karuk tribe, "the fish kill of '02 was sort of the same time the licenses to operate the dams expired... The fish kill sort of put an exclamation point on the need for removing the dams." The U.S. Fish and Wildlife Service attributed water diversions, approved by then Vice President Dick Cheney, to farmers and ranchers in the Klamath Basin to the fish kill. Cheney was subsequently investigated by the House Natural Resources Committee for his role in causing the fish kill.

In 2005, PacifiCorp applied for relicense to the federal government for the four hydroelectric dams on the Klamath, which would have extended the license for 50 years. Environmentalists, tribal groups, and other supporters stood in opposition to the relicensing.

Early appeals to Warren Buffett by movement groups to stop the relicense were denied. In one instance, after traveling to Buffett's headquarters in Omaha, Nebraska, few were allowed in to address Buffett. One of them was Merv George Jr. (Hupa), who would later become the Rogue River-Siskiyou National Forest Supervisor, along with wife, Wendy. Wendy spoke to an image of Buffett through theater-sized conference screens and stated: "Sir, I have heard you are kind. The dams are killing the fish and destroying my people's way of life." Buffet asked if she had finished, and then, as described by Diana Hartel, "explained utility company politics as if to a child." Forbes Magazine reportedly "wondered how he could be so heartless."

At an October 2008 meeting of the California State Water Resources Control Board, it was noted that "Coho, chinook, steelhead, Pacific lamprey and green sturgeon could disappear from the watershed forever" if the dams were to stay up. Hartel admits that opposition groups refused to listen to Indigenous peoples and movement groups, instead displaying that they were "proud of their place in the West and sadly ignorant of the plight of the tribes on the river." In a reflection published in 2011, Hartel, who is related to people within the opposition movement, states that "their arguments had a lot to do with settler pride of place, how we took this wild river and made it useful—building cheap hydropower, irrigating onions, growing potatoes for Frito-Lay, watering livestock."

The process of re-licensing the dams by PacifiCorp was terminated in 2009, after it determined that "the dams were too expensive to fix."

Negotiations 

On February 19, 2010, the Klamath Basin Restoration Agreement (KBRA) was signed by multiple parties, including Ken Salazar, PacifiCorp representatives, Oregon and California state governors and settlement representatives. 

On April 4, 2013, the U.S. Department of the Interior released a final environmental impact statement and recommended the removal the four dams. $1 billion in other environmental restoration would be allocated to aid native salmon runs on the Klamath. Ron Wyden, the senior U.S. senator from Oregon, introduced the Klamath Basin Water Recovery and Economic Restoration Act of 2014, which was cosponsored by fellow Oregon senator Jeff Merkley and by Nevada senator Dean Heller.

On February 8, 2017, a federal district court judge ruled in favor of removing the dams and agreed to a plan created by tribal scientists which would reduce outbreaks of disease among fish which had reportedly infected 90% of juvenile salmon between 2014 and 2015.

The U.S. Congress failed to pass legislation which would have implemented the KBRA by the January 1, 2016 deadline, which meant that a new agreement would have to be negotiated. As a result, the Klamath Hydroelectric Settlement Agreement (KHSA) was negotiated and signed on April 6, 2016. The amended agreement led to the creation of the Klamath River Renewal Corporation (KRRC), which would now apply for complete license transfer from PacifiCorp.

In April 2020, the California Water Board approved two key permits for removing the four large aging hydropower dams on the Klamath River. The board came to this conclusion "based on evidence that dam removal would improve drinking water quality by reducing algal blooms, and would restore habitat for endangered salmon and other organisms that rely on free-flowing rivers." However, even with this approval, the project still required approval from the Federal Energy Regulatory Commission (FERC).

On July 17, 2020 FERC stated that PacifiCorp would have to stay on the license during the removal process, rather than just walk away (as previously agreed to by both KRRC and PacifiCorp), "and take responsibility for cost overruns." As a result, PacifiCorp withdrew from the agreement and the dam removal process slowed once again.

On October 22, 2020, the movement was covered in a video story for Vice News. In the video, it was reported that "after a decade of negotiations, the [Yurok] tribe is starting to wonder if it will ever really happen." Salmon runs were reportedly the lowest they had ever been and Yurok tribal members explained that the salmon could not be sustained much longer.

As of February 25, 2022, FERC released their final Environmental Impact Statement (EIS). The four dams are expected to be removed sometime in 2023 or 2024.

References 

Social movements in the United States
Klamath River
Yurok
Karuk
Klamath
Hupa
Environmental justice in the United States
Environmental controversies
Indigenous peoples and the environment